Roderick P. Guiney (born 19 March 1970) is an Irish sportsperson.  He plays hurling with his local club Rosslare and was a member of the Wexford senior inter-county team in the 1990s and 2000s.  He has a twin brother named Dave who also played hurling with Wexford.

Teams

References

1970 births
Living people
Rathnure hurlers
Wexford inter-county hurlers
All-Ireland Senior Hurling Championship winners